Edward Michael Trucco (born June 22, 1970) is an American actor known for his role as Samuel Anders on the reimagined Battlestar Galactica and his recurring role as Nick Petteruti in How I Met Your Mother. He also appeared on the 2017–2018 Netflix series Disjointed, as Tae Kwon Douglas, a local martial arts instructor who was anti-drug.

Early life
A native of San Mateo, California, Trucco attended Junipero Serra High School where he played football and wrestled. He is the son of a police officer, and was once interested in becoming one himself until college, when he was attracted to theatrical performance. He took a theatre course for non-majors while he was studying Criminal Justice, but he did so well that he was asked to consider changing majors. He changed majors and completed his bachelor's degree in Theatre Arts at Santa Clara University. He has Italian and Norwegian ancestry.

Career
Trucco became active in television in the late 1990s with appearances in episodes of Touched by an Angel, Silk Stalkings, Beverly Hills, 90210, Sabrina The Teenage Witch, Dr. Quinn: Medicine Woman, and Pensacola: Wings of Gold among others. He continued appearing in shows of similar genres like CSI, Heartbeart, Strong Medicine, CSI: Miami, and others into the 2000s. He played Cooper Lee in six episodes of One Tree Hill from 2005 to 2006.

In 2002, Trucco starred in Wishmaster: The Prophecy Fulfilled. In 2005, he joined the drama Battlestar Galactica in the role of Samuel Anders. In 2008, he guest-starred on NBC's Law & Order: Special Victims Unit and The Big Bang Theory. In 2010, he guest-starred on ABC's series Castle as Detective Tom Demming. In 2010, Trucco was cast as a series regular in the USA Network series Fairly Legal.

Trucco guest-starred in a season 6 episode of How I Met Your Mother in 2011, and had a recurring role in the show's eighth season. He played the recurring character Nate Ryan in the second season of Revenge.

He later played Elliot's brother in the 2017 film The Bye Bye Man.

Trucco is also the lead guitarist of the band Simpleworld.

Personal life
On Sunday, December 2, 2007, Trucco was involved in a car accident with a friend who was driving a Ferrari 360 on the Pacific Coast Highway in Malibu, California. The vehicle flipped on an embankment, landing upside-down, impacting Trucco's side of the car. Trucco was badly injured in the accident, fracturing four of his vertebrae, whereas his friend walked away uninjured. He has stated that he initially lost feeling in his arms. He was eventually able to get out of the vehicle after regaining feeling in his hands and used his cell phone to call for emergency help. He was airlifted to UCLA Medical Center for further care. On December 10, 2007 he was released from the hospitals care. Doctors said he was extremely lucky, suffering almost the same injury as Christopher Reeve.

Filmography

References

External links

 
 

1970 births
20th-century American male actors
21st-century American male actors
American male film actors
American male television actors
American people of Italian descent
American people of Norwegian descent
Junípero Serra High School (San Mateo, California) alumni
Living people
Male actors from the San Francisco Bay Area
People from San Mateo, California
Santa Clara University alumni